Kësterite is a sulfide mineral with a chemical formula of . In its lattice structure, zinc and iron atoms share the same lattice sites. Kesterite is the Zn-rich variety whereas the Zn-poor form is called ferrokesterite or stannite. Owing to their similarity, kesterite is sometimes called isostannite. The synthetic form of kesterite is abbreviated as CZTS (from copper zinc tin sulfide). The name kesterite is sometimes extended to include this synthetic material and also CZTSe, which contains selenium instead of sulfur.

Occurrence
Kesterite was first described in 1958 in regard to an occurrence in the Kester deposit (and the associated locality) in Ynnakh Mountain, Yana basin, Yakutia, Russia, where it was discovered.

It is usually found in quartz-sulfide hydrothermal veins associated with tin ore deposits. Associated minerals include arsenopyrite, stannoidite, chalcopyrite, chalcocite, sphalerite and tennantite.

Stannite and kesterite occur together in the Ivigtut cryolite deposit of South Greenland. Solid solutions form between Cu2FeSnS4 and Cu2ZnSnS4 at temperatures above 680 °C. This accounts for the exsolved kesterite in stannite found in the cryolite.

Use
Kesterite like substances are being researched as a solar photovoltaic material.

References

Copper minerals
Iron(II) minerals
Tin minerals
Sulfide minerals
Tetragonal minerals
Minerals in space group 82